Kirtland may refer to:
Places
Kirtland, Ohio, a city located in Lake County, Ohio, United States
Kirtland Temple, the first temple to be built by adherents of the Latter Day Saint movement
Kirtland, New Mexico, a census-designated place located in San Juan County, New Mexico, United States
Kirtland Air Force Base at Albuquerque, New Mexico, United States
Kirtland Community College, a public college in Northern Michigan.

Nature
Kirtland Formation, a geological deposit in the U.S. state of New Mexico
Kirtland's warbler (Setophaga kirtlandii)
Kirtland's snake (Clonophis kirtlandii)

People
Jared Potter Kirtland (1793–1877), U.S. naturalist
Roy Carrington Kirtland (1874-1941), U.S. Army officer and aviation pioneer

Organizations
Kirtland Records, a record label based in Dallas, Texas, United States